The 91st United States Congress was a meeting of the legislative branch of the United States federal government, composed of the United States Senate and the United States House of Representatives. It met in Washington, D.C., from January 3, 1969, to January 3, 1971, during the final weeks of the presidency of Lyndon Johnson and the first two years of the first presidency of Richard Nixon.

The apportionment of seats in this House of Representatives was based on the 1960 United States census.

Both chambers had a Democratic majority - albeit with losing their supermajority status in the Senate.  With Richard Nixon being sworn in as president on January 20, 1969, this ended the Democrats' overall federal government trifecta that they had held since the 87th Congress.

Major events

January 20, 1969: Richard M. Nixon became 37th President of the United States.

Major legislation

 December 30, 1969: Tax Reform Act of 1969, 
 December 30, 1969: Federal Coal Mine Health and Safety Act, 
 January 1, 1970: National Environmental Policy Act, 
 April 1, 1970: Public Health Cigarette Smoking Act, 
 April 3, 1970: Environmental Quality Improvement Act, 
 May 21, 1970: Airport and Airway Development Act, title I
 August 12, 1970: Postal Reorganization Act (United States Postal Service), 
 August 15, 1970: Economic Stabilization Act, Title II of 
 September 22, 1970: District of Columbia Delegate Act, 
 October 15, 1970: Organized Crime Control Act,  (including the Racketeer Influenced and Corrupt Organizations Act ("RICO")
 October 15, 1970: Urban Mass Transportation Act of 1970, 
 October 26, 1970: Bank Secrecy Act, 
 October 26, 1970: Legislative Reorganization Act of 1970
 October 27, 1970: Controlled Substances Act, 
 October 30, 1970: Rail Passenger Service Act (Amtrak), 
 December 24, 1970: Family Planning Services and Population Research Act of 1970, 
 December 24, 1970: Plant Variety Protection Act, 
 December 29, 1970: Occupational Safety and Health Act (OSHA), 
 December 31, 1970: Clean Air Act Extension, 
 December 31, 1970: Housing and Urban Development Act of 1970, including title VII, National Urban Policy and New Community Development Act of 1970
 January 12, 1971: Foreign Military Sales Act of 1971, 
 January 13, 1971: Lead-Based Paint Poisoning Prevention Act,

Party summary
The count below identifies party affiliations at the beginning of the first session of this Congress, and includes members from vacancies and newly admitted states, when they were first seated. Changes resulting from subsequent replacements are shown below in the "Changes in membership" section.

Senate

House of Representatives

Leadership

Senate
 President: Hubert Humphrey (D), until January 20, 1969
 Spiro Agnew (R), from January 20, 1969
President pro tempore: Richard Russell Jr. (D)
 Permanent Acting President pro tempore: Lee Metcalf (D)

Majority (Democratic) leadership
 Majority Leader: Mike Mansfield
 Majority Whip: Ted Kennedy
 Caucus Secretary: Robert Byrd

Minority (Republican) leadership
Minority Leader: Everett Dirksen, until September 7, 1969
Hugh Scott, from September 24, 1969
Minority Whip: Hugh Scott, until September 24, 1969
Robert P. Griffin, from September 24, 1969
 Republican Conference Chairman: Margaret Chase Smith
 Republican Conference Secretary: Milton Young
 National Senatorial Committee Chair: John Tower
 Policy Committee Chairman: Gordon Allott

House of Representatives
Speaker: John W. McCormack (D)

Majority (Democratic) leadership
Majority Leader: Carl Albert
Majority Whip: Hale Boggs
 Democratic Caucus Chairman: Dan Rostenkowski
 Democratic Caucus Secretary: Leonor Sullivan
 Democratic Campaign Committee Chairman: Michael A. Feighan

Minority (Republican) leadership
Minority Leader: Gerald Ford
Minority Whip: Leslie C. Arends
 Republican Conference Chairman: John B. Anderson
 Republican Conference Secretary: Richard H. Poff
 Policy Committee Chairman: John Jacob Rhodes
 Republican Campaign Committee Chairman: Bob Wilson

Caucuses
 House Democratic Caucus
 Senate Democratic Caucus

Members 
This list is arranged by chamber, then by state. Senators are listed by class, and Members of the House are listed by district.

Senate 
Senators are popularly elected statewide every two years, with one-third beginning new six-year terms with each Congress. Preceding the names in the list below are Senate class numbers, which indicate the cycle of their election. In this Congress, Class 1 meant their term ended with this Congress, requiring re-election in 1970; Class 2 meant their term began in the last Congress, requiring re-election in 1972; and Class 3 meant their term began in this Congress, requiring re-election in 1974.

Alabama 
 2. John Sparkman (D)
 3. James Allen (D)

Alaska 
 2. Ted Stevens (R)
 3. Mike Gravel (D)

Arizona 
 1. Paul Fannin (R)
 3. Barry Goldwater (R)

Arkansas 
 2. John L. McClellan (D)
 3. J. William Fulbright (D)

California 
 1. George Murphy (R), until January 2, 1971
 John V. Tunney (D), from January 2, 1971
 3. Alan Cranston (D)

Colorado 
 2. Gordon Allott (R)
 3. Peter H. Dominick (R)

Connecticut 
 1. Thomas J. Dodd (D)
 3. Abraham Ribicoff (D)

Delaware 
 1. John J. Williams (R), until December 30, 1970
 William Roth (R), from January 1, 1971
 2. J. Caleb Boggs (R)

Florida 
 1. Spessard Holland (D)
 3. Edward Gurney (R)

Georgia 
 2. Richard Russell Jr. (D)
 3. Herman Talmadge (D)

Hawaii 
 1. Hiram Fong (R)
 3. Daniel Inouye (D)

Idaho 
 2. Leonard B. Jordan (R)
 3. Frank Church (D)

Illinois 
 2. Charles H. Percy (R)
 3. Everett Dirksen (R), until September 7, 1969
 Ralph Tyler Smith (R), September 17, 1969 - November 3, 1970
 Adlai Stevenson III (D), from November 17, 1970

Indiana 
 1. Vance Hartke (D)
 3. Birch Bayh (D)

Iowa 
 2. Jack Miller (R)
 3. Harold Hughes (D)

Kansas 
 2. James B. Pearson (R)
 3. Bob Dole (R)

Kentucky 
 2. John Sherman Cooper (R)
 3. Marlow Cook (R)

Louisiana 
 2. Allen J. Ellender (D)
 3. Russell B. Long (D)

Maine 
 1. Edmund Muskie (D)
 2. Margaret Chase Smith (R)

Maryland 
 1. Joseph Tydings (D)
 3. Charles Mathias (R)

Massachusetts 
 1. Ted Kennedy (D)
 2. Edward Brooke (R)

Michigan 
 1. Philip Hart (D)
 2. Robert P. Griffin (R)

Minnesota 
 1. Eugene McCarthy (DFL)
 2. Walter Mondale (DFL)

Mississippi 
 1. John C. Stennis (D)
 2. James Eastland (D)

Missouri 
 1. Stuart Symington (D)
 3. Thomas Eagleton (D)

Montana 
 1. Mike Mansfield (D)
 2. Lee Metcalf (D)

Nebraska 
 1. Roman Hruska (R)
 2. Carl Curtis (R)

Nevada 
 1. Howard Cannon (D)
 3. Alan Bible (D)

New Hampshire 
 2. Thomas J. McIntyre (D)
 3. Norris Cotton (R)

New Jersey 
 1. Harrison A. Williams (D)
 2. Clifford P. Case (R)

New Mexico 
 1. Joseph Montoya (D)
 2. Clinton Anderson (D)

New York 
 1. Charles Goodell (R)
 3. Jacob Javits (R)

North Carolina 
 2. B. Everett Jordan (D)
 3. Sam Ervin (D)

North Dakota 
 1. Quentin Burdick (D-NPL)
 3. Milton Young (R)

Ohio 
 1. Stephen M. Young (D)
 3. William B. Saxbe (R)

Oklahoma 
 2. Fred R. Harris (D)
 3. Henry Bellmon (R)

Oregon 
 2. Mark Hatfield (R)
 3. Bob Packwood (R)

Pennsylvania 
 1. Hugh Scott (R)
 3. Richard Schweiker (R)

Rhode Island 
 1. John Pastore (D)
 2. Claiborne Pell (D)

South Carolina 
 2. Strom Thurmond (R)
 3. Fritz Hollings (D)

South Dakota 
 2. Karl E. Mundt (R)
 3. George McGovern (D)

Tennessee 
 1. Albert Gore Sr. (D)
 2. Howard Baker (R)

Texas 
 1. Ralph Yarborough (D)
 2. John Tower (R)

Utah 
 1. Frank Moss (D)
 3. Wallace F. Bennett (R)

Vermont 
 1. Winston L. Prouty (R)
 3. George Aiken (R)

Virginia 
 1. Harry F. Byrd Jr. (D)
 2. William B. Spong Jr. (D)

Washington 
 1. Henry M. Jackson (D)
 3. Warren Magnuson (D)

West Virginia 
 1. Robert Byrd (D)
 2. Jennings Randolph (D)

Wisconsin 
 1. William Proxmire (D)
 3. Gaylord Nelson (D)

Wyoming 
 1. Gale W. McGee (D)
 2. Clifford Hansen (R)

House of Representatives 
Some members of the House of Representatives were elected statewide on the general ticket or otherwise at-large, and others were elected from districts, as listed here as the districts existed at this time.

Alabama 
 . Jack Edwards (R)
 . William Louis Dickinson (R)
 . George W. Andrews (D)
 . Bill Nichols (D)
 . Walter Flowers (D)
 . John Hall Buchanan Jr. (R)
 . Tom Bevill (D)
 . Robert E. Jones Jr. (D)

Alaska 
 . Howard Wallace Pollock (R)

Arizona 
 . John Jacob Rhodes (R)
 . Mo Udall (D)
 . Sam Steiger (R)

Arkansas 
 . William Vollie Alexander Jr. (D)
 . Wilbur Mills (D)
 . John Paul Hammerschmidt (R)
 . David Pryor (D)

California 
 . Donald H. Clausen (R)
 . Harold T. Johnson (D)
 . John E. Moss (D)
 . Robert L. Leggett (D)
 . Phillip Burton (D)
 . William S. Mailliard (R)
 . Jeffery Cohelan (D)
 . George P. Miller (D)
 . Don Edwards (D)
 . Charles Gubser (R)
 . Pete McCloskey (R)
 . Burt Talcott (R)
 . Charles M. Teague (R)
 . Jerome Waldie (D)
 . John J. McFall (D)
 . B. F. Sisk (D)
 . Glenn M. Anderson (D)
 . Bob Mathias (R)
 . Chester E. Holifield (D)
 . H. Allen Smith (R)
 . Augustus Hawkins (D)
 . James C. Corman (D)
 . Del M. Clawson (R)
 . Glenard P. Lipscomb (R), until February 1, 1970
 John H. Rousselot (R), from June 30, 1970
 . Charles E. Wiggins (R)
 . Thomas M. Rees (D)
 . Edwin Reinecke (R), until January 21, 1969
 Barry Goldwater Jr. (R), from April 29, 1969
 . Alphonzo E. Bell Jr. (R)
 . George Brown Jr. (D)
 . Edward R. Roybal (D)
 . Charles H. Wilson (D)
 . Craig Hosmer (R)
 . Jerry Pettis (R)
 . Richard T. Hanna (D)
 . James B. Utt (R), until March 1, 1970
 John G. Schmitz (R), from June 30, 1970
 . Bob Wilson (R)
 . Lionel Van Deerlin (D)
 . John V. Tunney (D), until January 2, 1971

Colorado 
 . Byron G. Rogers (D)
 . Donald G. Brotzman (R)
 . Frank Evans (D)
 . Wayne N. Aspinall (D)

Connecticut 
 . Emilio Q. Daddario (D)
 . William St. Onge (D), until May 1, 1970
 Robert H. Steele (R), from November 3, 1970
 . Robert Giaimo (D)
 . Lowell Weicker (R)
 . John S. Monagan (D)
 . Thomas Meskill (R)

Delaware 
 . William Roth (R), until December 31, 1970

Florida 
 . Bob Sikes (D)
 . Don Fuqua (D)
 . Charles E. Bennett (D)
 . Bill Chappell (D)
 . Louis Frey Jr. (R)
 . Sam Gibbons (D)
 . James A. Haley (D)
 . William C. Cramer (R)
 . Paul Rogers (D)
 . J. Herbert Burke (R)
 . Claude Pepper (D)
 . Dante Fascell (D)

Georgia 
 . George Elliott Hagan (D)
 . Maston E. O'Neal Jr. (D)
 . Jack Brinkley (D)
 . Benjamin B. Blackburn (R)
 . Fletcher Thompson (R)
 . John Flynt (D)
 . John William Davis (D)
 . W. S. Stuckey Jr. (D)
 . Phillip M. Landrum (D)
 . Robert Grier Stephens Jr. (D)

Hawaii 
Both members were elected statewide on a general ticket.
 . Spark Matsunaga (D)
 . Patsy Mink (D)

Idaho 
 . James A. McClure (R)
 . Orval H. Hansen (R)

Illinois 
 . William L. Dawson (D), until November 9, 1970
 . Abner J. Mikva (D)
 . William T. Murphy (D)
 . Ed Derwinski (R)
 . John C. Kluczynski (D)
 . Daniel J. Ronan (D), until August 13, 1969
 George W. Collins (D), from November 3, 1970 
 . Frank Annunzio (D)
 . Dan Rostenkowski (D)
 . Sidney R. Yates (D)
 . Harold R. Collier (R)
 . Roman Pucinski (D)
 . Robert McClory (R)
 . Donald Rumsfeld (R), until May 25, 1969
 Phil Crane (R), from November 25, 1969
 . John N. Erlenborn (R)
 . Charlotte Thompson Reid (R)
 . John B. Anderson (R)
 . Leslie C. Arends (R)
 . Robert H. Michel (R)
 . Tom Railsback (R)
 . Paul Findley (R)
 . Kenneth J. Gray (D)
 . William L. Springer (R)
 . George E. Shipley (D)
 . Melvin Price (D)

Indiana 
 . Ray Madden (D)
 . Earl Landgrebe (R)
 . John Brademas (D)
 . E. Ross Adair (R)
 . Richard L. Roudebush (R)
 . William G. Bray (R)
 . John T. Myers (R)
 . Roger H. Zion (R)
 . Lee H. Hamilton (D)
 . David W. Dennis (R)
 . Andrew Jacobs Jr. (D)

Iowa 
 . Fred Schwengel (R)
 . John Culver (D)
 . Harold R. Gross (R)
 . John Henry Kyl (R)
 . Neal Edward Smith (D)
 . Wiley Mayne (R)
 . William J. Scherle (R)

Kansas 
 . Keith Sebelius (R)
 . Chester L. Mize (R)
 . Larry Winn (R)
 . Garner E. Shriver (R)
 . Joe Skubitz (R)

Kentucky 
 . Frank Stubblefield (D)
 . William Natcher (D)
 . William Cowger (R)
 . Gene Snyder (R)
 . Tim Lee Carter (R)
 . John C. Watts (D)
 . Carl D. Perkins (D)

Louisiana 
 . F. Edward Hébert (D)
 . Hale Boggs (D)
 . Patrick T. Caffery (D)
 . Joe Waggonner (D)
 . Otto Passman (D)
 . John Rarick (D)
 . Edwin Edwards (D)
 . Speedy Long (D)

Maine 
 . Peter Kyros (D)
 . William Hathaway (D)

Maryland 
 . Rogers Morton (R)
 . Clarence Long (D)
 . Edward Garmatz (D)
 . George Hyde Fallon (D)
 . Lawrence Hogan (R)
 . J. Glenn Beall Jr. (R)
 . Samuel Friedel (D)
 . Gilbert Gude (R)

Massachusetts 
 . Silvio O. Conte (R)
 . Edward Boland (D)
 . Philip J. Philbin (D)
 . Harold Donohue (D)
 . F. Bradford Morse (R)
 . William H. Bates (R), until June 22, 1969
 Michael J. Harrington (D), from September 30, 1969
 . Torbert Macdonald (D)
 . Tip O'Neill (D)
 . John W. McCormack (D)
 . Margaret Heckler (R)
 . James A. Burke (D)
 . Hastings Keith (R)

Michigan 
 . John Conyers (D)
 . Marvin L. Esch (R)
 . Garry E. Brown (R)
 . J. Edward Hutchinson (R)
 . Gerald Ford (R)
 . Charles E. Chamberlain (R)
 . Donald Riegle (R)
 . R. James Harvey (R)
 . Guy Vander Jagt (R)
 . Elford Albin Cederberg (R)
 . Philip Ruppe (R)
 . James G. O'Hara (D)
 . Charles Diggs (D)
 . Lucien Nedzi (D)
 . William D. Ford (D)
 . John Dingell (D)
 . Martha Griffiths (D)
 . William Broomfield (R)
 . Jack H. McDonald (R)

Minnesota 
 . Al Quie (R)
 . Ancher Nelsen (R)
 . Clark MacGregor (R)
 . Joseph Karth (DFL)
 . Donald M. Fraser (DFL)
 . John M. Zwach (R)
 . Odin Langen (R)
 . John Blatnik (DFL)

Mississippi 
 . Thomas Abernethy (D)
 . Jamie Whitten (D)
 . Charles H. Griffin (D)
 . Sonny Montgomery (D)
 . William M. Colmer (D)

Missouri 
 . Bill Clay (D)
 . James W. Symington (D)
 . Leonor Sullivan (D)
 . William J. Randall (D)
 . Richard Walker Bolling (D)
 . William Raleigh Hull Jr. (D)
 . Durward Gorham Hall (R)
 . Richard Howard Ichord Jr. (D)
 . William L. Hungate (D)
 . Bill Burlison (D)

Montana 
 . Arnold Olsen (D)
 . James F. Battin (R), until February 27, 1969
 John Melcher (D), from June 24, 1969

Nebraska 
 . Robert Vernon Denney (R)
 . Glenn Cunningham (R)
 . David Martin (R)

Nevada 
 . Walter S. Baring Jr. (D)

New Hampshire 
 . Louis C. Wyman (R)
 . James Colgate Cleveland (R)

New Jersey 
 . John E. Hunt (R)
 . Charles W. Sandman Jr. (R)
 . James J. Howard (D)
 . Frank Thompson (D)
 . Peter Frelinghuysen Jr. (R)
 . William T. Cahill (R), until January 19, 1970
 Edwin B. Forsythe (R), from November 3, 1970
 . William B. Widnall (R)
 . Charles Samuel Joelson (D), until September 4, 1969
 Robert A. Roe (D), from November 4, 1969
 . Henry Helstoski (D)
 . Peter W. Rodino (D)
 . Joseph Minish (D)
 . Florence P. Dwyer (R)
 . Cornelius Gallagher (D)
 . Dominick V. Daniels (D)
 . Edward J. Patten (D)

New Mexico 
 . Manuel Lujan Jr. (R)
 . Ed Foreman (R)

New York 
 . Otis G. Pike (D)
 . James R. Grover Jr. (R)
 . Lester L. Wolff (D)
 . John W. Wydler (R)
 . Allard K. Lowenstein (D)
 . Seymour Halpern (R)
 . Joseph P. Addabbo (D)
 . Benjamin Stanley Rosenthal (D)
 . James J. Delaney (D)
 . Emanuel Celler (D)
 . Frank J. Brasco (D)
 . Shirley Chisholm (D)
 . Bertram L. Podell (D)
 . John J. Rooney (D)
 . Hugh Carey (D)
 . John M. Murphy (D)
 . Ed Koch (D)
 . Adam Clayton Powell Jr. (D)
 . Leonard Farbstein (D)
 . William Fitts Ryan (D)
 . James H. Scheuer (D)
 . Jacob H. Gilbert (D)
 . Jonathan Brewster Bingham (D)
 . Mario Biaggi (D)
 . Richard Ottinger (D)
 . Ogden R. Reid (R)
 . Martin B. McKneally (R)
 . Hamilton Fish IV (R)
 . Daniel E. Button (R)
 . Carleton J. King (R)
 . Robert C. McEwen (R)
 . Alexander Pirnie (R)
 . Howard W. Robison (R)
 . James M. Hanley (D)
 . Samuel S. Stratton (D)
 . Frank Horton (R)
 . Barber Conable (R)
 . James F. Hastings (R)
 . Richard D. McCarthy (D)
 . Henry P. Smith III (R)
 . Thaddeus J. Dulski (D)

North Carolina 
 . Walter B. Jones Sr. (D)
 . Lawrence H. Fountain (D)
 . David N. Henderson (D)
 . Nick Galifianakis (D)
 . Wilmer Mizell (R)
 . L. Richardson Preyer (D)
 . Alton Lennon (D)
 . Earl B. Ruth (R)
 . Charles R. Jonas (R)
 . Jim Broyhill (R)
 . Roy A. Taylor (D)

North Dakota 
 . Mark Andrews (R)
 . Thomas S. Kleppe (R)

Ohio 
 . Robert Taft Jr. (R)
 . Donald D. Clancy (R)
 . Charles W. Whalen Jr. (R)
 . William Moore McCulloch (R)
 . Del Latta (R)
 . Bill Harsha (R)
 . Bud Brown (R)
 . Jackson Edward Betts (R)
 . Thomas L. Ashley (D)
 . Clarence E. Miller (R)
 . J. William Stanton (R)
 . Samuel L. Devine (R)
 . Charles Adams Mosher (R)
 . William Hanes Ayres (R)
 . Chalmers Wylie (R)
 . Frank T. Bow (R)
 . John M. Ashbrook (R)
 . Wayne Hays (D)
 . Michael J. Kirwan (D), until July 27, 1970
 Charles J. Carney (D), from November 3, 1970
 . Michael A. Feighan (D)
 . Louis Stokes (D)
 . Charles Vanik (D)
 . William Edwin Minshall Jr. (R)
 . Buz Lukens (R)

Oklahoma 
 . Page Belcher (R)
 . Ed Edmondson (D)
 . Carl Albert (D)
 . Tom Steed (D)
 . John Jarman (D)
 . John Newbold Camp (R)

Oregon 
 . Wendell Wyatt (R)
 . Al Ullman (D)
 . Edith Green (D)
 . John R. Dellenback (R)

Pennsylvania 
 . William A. Barrett (D)
 . Robert N. C. Nix Sr. (D)
 . James A. Byrne (D)
 . Joshua Eilberg (D)
 . William J. Green III (D)
 . Gus Yatron (D)
 . Lawrence G. Williams (R)
 . Edward G. Biester Jr. (R)
 . George Watkins (R), until August 7, 1970
 John H. Ware III (R), from November 3, 1970
 . Joseph M. McDade (R)
 . Dan Flood (D)
 . J. Irving Whalley (R)
 . Lawrence Coughlin (R)
 . William S. Moorhead (D)
 . Fred B. Rooney (D)
 . Edwin Duing Eshleman (R)
 . Herman T. Schneebeli (R)
 . Robert J. Corbett (R)
 . George Atlee Goodling (R)
 . Joseph M. Gaydos (D)
 . John Herman Dent (D)
 . John P. Saylor (R)
 . Albert W. Johnson (R)
 . Joseph P. Vigorito (D)
 . Frank M. Clark (D)
 . Thomas E. Morgan (D)
 . James G. Fulton (R)

Rhode Island 
 . Fernand St. Germain (D)
 . Robert Tiernan (D)

South Carolina 
 . L. Mendel Rivers (D), until December 28, 1970
 . Albert Watson (R)
 . William Jennings Bryan Dorn (D)
 . James Mann (D)
 . Thomas S. Gettys (D)
 . John L. McMillan (D)

South Dakota 
 . Ben Reifel (R)
 . Ellis Yarnal Berry (R)

Tennessee 
 . Jimmy Quillen (R)
 . John Duncan Sr. (R)
 . Bill Brock (R)
 . Joe L. Evins (D)
 . Richard Fulton (D)
 . William Anderson (D)
 . Ray Blanton (D)
 . Fats Everett (D), until January 26, 1969
 Ed Jones (D), from March 25, 1969
 . Dan Kuykendall (R)

Texas 
 . Wright Patman (D)
 . John Dowdy (D)
 . James M. Collins (R)
 . Ray Roberts (D)
 . Earle Cabell (D)
 . Olin E. Teague (D)
 . George H. W. Bush (R)
 . Robert C. Eckhardt (D)
 . Jack Brooks (D)
 . J. J. Pickle (D)
 . William R. Poage (D)
 . Jim Wright (D)
 . Graham B. Purcell Jr. (D)
 . John Andrew Young (D)
 . Kika de la Garza (D)
 . Richard Crawford White (D)
 . Omar Burleson (D)
 . Bob Price (R)
 . George H. Mahon (D)
 . Henry B. González (D)
 . O. C. Fisher (D)
 . Robert R. Casey (D)
 . Abraham Kazen (D)

Utah 
 . Laurence J. Burton (R)
 . Sherman P. Lloyd (R)

Vermont 
 . Robert Stafford (R)

Virginia 
 . Thomas N. Downing (D)
 . G. William Whitehurst (R)
 . David E. Satterfield III (D)
 . Watkins Moorman Abbitt (D)
 . Dan Daniel (D)
 . Richard Harding Poff (R)
 . John Otho Marsh Jr. (D)
 . William L. Scott (R)
 . William C. Wampler (R)
 . Joel Broyhill (R)

Washington 
 . Thomas Pelly (R)
 . Lloyd Meeds (D)
 . Julia Butler Hansen (D)
 . Catherine Dean May (R)
 . Tom Foley (D)
 . Floyd Hicks (D)
 . Brock Adams (D)

West Virginia 
 . Bob Mollohan (D)
 . Harley Orrin Staggers (D)
 . John M. Slack Jr. (D)
 . Ken Hechler (D)
 . James Kee (D)

Wisconsin 
 . Henry C. Schadeberg (R)
 . Robert Kastenmeier (D)
 . Vernon Wallace Thomson (R)
 . Clement J. Zablocki (D)
 . Henry S. Reuss (D)
 . William A. Steiger (R)
 . Melvin Laird (R), until January 21, 1969
 Dave Obey (D), from April 1, 1969
 . John W. Byrnes (R)
 . Glenn Robert Davis (R)
 . Alvin O'Konski (R)

Wyoming 
 . John S. Wold (R)

Delegates 
 . Jorge Luis Córdova (Resident Commissioner) (PNP)

Changes in membership
The count below reflects changes from the beginning of the first session of this Congress

Senate
 Replacements: 3
 Democratic: 2 seat net gain
 Republican: 2 seat net loss
 Deaths: 1
 Resignations: 2
Total seats with changes: 3 

|-
| Illinois(3)
|  | Everett Dirksen (R)
| style="font-size:80%" | Died September 7, 1969
|  | Ralph Tyler Smith (R)
| September 17, 1969
|-
| Illinois(3)
|  | Ralph Tyler Smith (R)
| style="font-size:80%" | Successor elected November 3, 1970
|  | Adlai Stevenson III (D)
| November 17, 1970
|-
| Delaware(1)
|  | John J. Williams (R)
| style="font-size:80%" | Resigned December 30, 1970
|  | William Roth (R)
| January 1, 1971
|-
| California(1)
|  | George Murphy (R)
| style="font-size:80%" | Resigned January 2, 1971
|  | John V. Tunney (D)
| January 2, 1971
|}

House of Representatives
 Replacements: 14
 Democratic: 2 seat net gain
 Republican: 2 seat net loss
 Deaths: 10
 Resignations: 8
Total seats with changes: 18 

|- 
| 
|  nowrap| Edwin Reinecke (R)
| style="font-size:80%" | Resigned January 21, 1969, after becoming Lieutenant Governor of California
|  nowrap | Barry Goldwater Jr. (R)
| April 29, 1969
|- 
| 
|  nowrap| Melvin Laird (R)
| style="font-size:80%" | Resigned January 21, 1969, after being appointed United States Secretary of Defense
|  nowrap | Dave Obey (D)
| April 1, 1969
|- 
| 
|  nowrap| Fats Everett (D)
| style="font-size:80%" | Died January 26, 1969
|  nowrap | Ed Jones (D)
| March 25, 1969
|- 
| 
|  nowrap| James F. Battin (R)
| style="font-size:80%" | Resigned February 27, 1969, after being appointed judge for the US District Court for the District of Montana
|  nowrap | John Melcher (D)
| June 24, 1969
|- 
| 
|  nowrap| Donald Rumsfeld (R)
| style="font-size:80%" | Resigned May 25, 1969, after being appointed Director of the Office of Economic Opportunity
|  nowrap | Phil Crane (R)
| November 25, 1969
|- 
| 
|  nowrap| William H. Bates (R)
| style="font-size:80%" | Died June 22, 1969
|  nowrap | Michael J. Harrington (D)
| September 30, 1969
|- 
| 
|  nowrap| Daniel J. Ronan (D)
| style="font-size:80%" | Died August 13, 1969
|  nowrap | George W. Collins (D)
| November 3, 1970
|- 
| 
|  nowrap| Charles Samuel Joelson (D)
| style="font-size:80%" | Resigned September 4, 1969, after becoming judge of Superior Court of New Jersey
|  nowrap | Robert A. Roe (D)
| November 4, 1969
|- 
| 
|  nowrap| William T. Cahill (R)
| style="font-size:80%" | Resigned January 19, 1970, after becoming Governor of New Jersey
|  nowrap | Edwin B. Forsythe (R)
| November 3, 1970
|- 
| 
|  nowrap| Glenard P. Lipscomb (R)
| style="font-size:80%" | Died February 1, 1970
|  nowrap | John H. Rousselot (R)
| June 30, 1970
|- 
| 
|  nowrap| James B. Utt (R)
| style="font-size:80%" | Died March 1, 1970
|  nowrap | John G. Schmitz (R)
| June 30, 1970
|- 
| 
|  nowrap| William St. Onge (D)
| style="font-size:80%" | Died May 1, 1970
|  nowrap | Robert H. Steele (R)
| November 3, 1970
|- 
| 
|  nowrap| Michael J. Kirwan (D)
| style="font-size:80%" | Died July 27, 1970
|  nowrap | Charles J. Carney (D)
| November 3, 1970
|- 
| 
|  nowrap| George Watkins (R)
| style="font-size:80%" | Died August 7, 1970
|  nowrap | John H. Ware III (R)
| November 3, 1970
|- 
| 
|  nowrap| William L. Dawson (D)
| style="font-size:80%" | Died November 9, 1970
| rowspan=4 |Vacant
| rowspan=4 |Not filled this term
|- 
| 
|  nowrap| L. Mendel Rivers (D)
| style="font-size:80%" | Died December 28, 1970
|- 
| 
|  nowrap| William Roth (R)
| style="font-size:80%" | Resigned December 31, 1970, after being appointed to the U.S. Senate
|- 
| 
|  nowrap| John V. Tunney (D)
| style="font-size:80%" | Resigned January 2, 1971, after being appointed to the U.S. Senate
|}

Committees

Senate

 Aeronautical and Space Sciences (Chair: Clinton P. Anderson; Ranking Member: Margaret Chase Smith)
 Agriculture and Forestry (Chair: Allen J. Ellender; Ranking Member: George D. Aiken) 
 Appropriations (Chair: Richard B. Russell; Ranking Member: Milton R. Young)
 Armed Services (Chair: John C. Stennis; Ranking Member: Margaret Chase Smith)
 Banking and Currency (Chair: John J. Sparkman; Ranking Member: Wallace F. Bennett)
 Commerce (Chair: Warren G. Magnuson; Ranking Member: Norris Cotton)
 District of Columbia (Chair: Joseph D. Tydings; Ranking Member: Winston L. Prouty)
 Equal Educational Opportunity (Select)
 Finance (Chair: Russell B. Long; Ranking Member: John J. Williams)
 Foreign Relations (Chair: J. William Fulbright; Ranking Member: George D. Aiken) 
 Government Operations (Chair: John Little McClellan; Ranking Member: Karl E. Mundt)
 Interior and Insular Affairs (Chair: Henry M. Jackson; Ranking Member: Gordon Allott)
 Judiciary (Chair: James O. Eastland; Ranking Member: Everett M. Dirksen)
 Labor and Public Welfare (Chair: Ralph W. Yarborough; Ranking Member: Jacob K. Javits)
 Nutrition and Human Needs (Select) (Chair: George S. McGovern)
 Post Office and Civil Service (Chair: Gale W. McGee; Ranking Member: Hiram Fong)
 Public Works (Chair: Jennings Randolph; Ranking Member: John Sherman Cooper)
 Rules and Administration (Chair: B. Everett Jordan; Ranking Member: Carl T. Curtis)
 Small Business (Select) (Chair: Alan Bible)
 Standards and Conduct (Select) (Chair: John C. Stennis; Vice Chairman: Wallace F. Bennett)
 Whole

House of Representatives

 Agriculture (Chair: William R. Poage; Ranking Member: Page Belcher)
 Appropriations (Chair: George H. Mahon; Ranking Member: Frank T. Bow)
 Armed Services (Chair: L. Mendel Rivers; Ranking Member: William H. Bates)
 Banking and Currency (Chair: Wright Patman; Ranking Member: William B. Widnall)
 District of Columbia (Chair: John L. McMillan; Ranking Member: Ancher Nelsen)
 Education and Labor (Chair: Carl D. Perkins; Ranking Member: William H. Ayres)
 Foreign Affairs (Chair: Thomas E. Morgan; Ranking Member: E. Ross Adair)
 Government Operations (Chair: William L. Dawson; Ranking Member: Florence P. Dwyer)
 House Administration (Chair: Samuel N. Friedel; Ranking Member: Glenard P. Lipscomb)
 House Beauty Shop (Select) (Chair: Martha W. Griffiths)
 House Restaurant (Select) (Chairman: N/A; Ranking Member: N/A)
 Interior and Insular Affairs (Chair: Wayne N. Aspinall; Ranking Member: John P. Saylor)
 Internal Security (Chair: Richard H. Ichord; Ranking Member: John M. Ashbrook)
 Interstate and Foreign Commerce (Chair: Harley O. Staggers; Ranking Member: William L. Springer)
 Judiciary (Chair: Emanuel Celler; Ranking Member: William M. McCulloch)
 Merchant Marine and Fisheries (Chair: Edward A. Garmatz; Ranking Member: William S. Mailliard)
 Parking (Select) (Chair: Bernice F. Sisk)
 Post Office and Civil Service (Chair: Thaddeus J. Dulski; Ranking Member: Robert J. Corbett)
 Public Works (Chair: George Hyde Fallon; Ranking Member: William C. Cramer)
 Rules (Chair: William M. Colmer; Ranking Member: H. Allen Smith) 
 Science and Astronautics (Chair: George P. Miller; Ranking Member: James G. Fulton)
 Small Business (Select) (Chair: Joe L. Evins)
 Standards of Official Conduct (Chair: Charles Melvin Price; Ranking Member: Leslie C. Arends)
 Veterans' Affairs (Chair: Olin E. Teague; Ranking Member: Charles M. Teague) 
 Ways and Means (Chair: Wilbur D. Mills; Ranking Member: John W. Byrnes)
 Whole

Joint committees

 Atomic Energy (Chair: Rep. Chet Holifield; Vice Chair: Sen. John O. Pastore) 
 Congressional Operations 
 Defense Productions (Chair: Sen. John J. Sparkman; Vice Chair: Rep. Wright Patman)
 Disposition of Executive Papers 
 Economic (Chair: Rep. Wright Patman; Vice Chair: Sen. William Proxmire)
 Immigration and Nationality Policy 
 Legislative Budget (Chair: Rep. Wilbur D. Mills)
 The Library (Chair: Rep. Samuel N. Friedel; Vice Chair: Sen. B. Everett Jordan)
 Navajo-Hopi Indian Administration 
 Printing (Chair: Sen. B. Everett Jordan; Vice Chair: Rep. Samuel N. Friedel)
 Reduction of Nonessential Federal Expenditures (Chair: Rep. George H. Mahon)
 Taxation (Chair: Rep. Wilbur D. Mills; Vice Chair: Sen. Russell B. Long)

Employees

See also
 1968 United States elections (elections leading to this Congress)
 1968 United States presidential election
 1968 United States Senate elections
 1968 United States House of Representatives elections
 1970 United States elections (elections during this Congress, leading to the next Congress)
 1970 United States Senate elections
 1970 United States House of Representatives elections

Notes

References

External links
 Biographical Directory of the U.S. Congress
 U.S. House of Representatives: Congressional History
 U.S. Senate: Statistics and Lists